Hugh Pierce Jamieson (September 1, 1852 – October 22, 1936) was an American businessman and politician.

Born to Scottish immigrants in Poynette, Wisconsin, Jamieson went to University of Wisconsin and Northwestern Business College. He was a dealer in coal, grain, lumber, machinery, and livestock. Jamieson helped start the Central Wisconsin Trust Company and the Bank of Poynette. Jamieson served on the high school board as clerk and director and on the Poynette village board as trustee. In 1893, Jamieson served in the Wisconsin State Assembly and was a Democrat. Jamieson died in Poynette, Wisconsin.

Notes

1852 births
1936 deaths
People from Poynette, Wisconsin
Madison Business College alumni
University of Wisconsin–Madison alumni
Businesspeople from Wisconsin
School board members in Wisconsin
Wisconsin city council members
Democratic Party members of the Wisconsin State Assembly